2Z or 2-Z may refer to:

Play 2Z; see Nickelodeon Games and Sports for Kids
2Z, IATA code Chang An Airlines
2-Z (album), by Matthew Shipp

See also
Z2 (disambiguation)